The 42nd Pennsylvania House of Representatives District is located in southwest Pennsylvania and has been represented since 2013 by Dan Miller.

District profile
The 42nd Pennsylvania House of Representatives District is located in Allegheny County and includes the following areas:

 Baldwin Township
 Castle Shannon
 Dormont
 Mt. Lebanon
Upper St. Clair Township (part)
Ward 01 
Ward 02 
Ward 03 (part)
Division 03
Ward 04 (part) 
Division 01

Representatives

Recent election results

References

External links
District map from the United States Census Bureau
Pennsylvania House Legislative District Maps from the Pennsylvania Redistricting Commission.
Population Data for District 42 from the Pennsylvania Redistricting Commission.

Government of Allegheny County, Pennsylvania
42